The 1994–95 Macedonian Second Football League was the third season since its establishment. It began in August 1994 and ended in June 1995.

East

Participating teams 
{{Location map+|North Macedonia|float=right|width=420|caption=Location of teams in 1994–95 Macedonian Second League - East|places=

League standing

West

Participating teams

League standing

See also
1994–95 Macedonian Football Cup
1994–95 Macedonian First Football League

References

External links
Macedonia - List of final tables (RSSSF)
Football Federation of Macedonia 
MacedonianFootball.com 

Macedonia 2
2
Macedonian Second Football League seasons